Zacorisca vexillifera is a species of moth of the  family Tortricidae. It is found in New Guinea.

The wingspan is 26–28 mm. The forewings are deep purple with a broad yellow band occupying the basal third of the wing but leaving short connected streaks on the base of the costa and the dorsum and in the costal fold dark blue. Beyond this, the ground colour is suffused deep blue-green. There is a rather 
narrow dull coppery-reddish terminal fascia and the terminal edge is deep purple. The hindwings are purple-blackish.

References

	

Moths described in 1924
Zacorisca